Caterham is a town in Surrey, England.

Caterham may also refer to:

 Caterham Group, parent company for automotive and motor racing businesses
 Caterham Cars, a British manufacturer of specialist lightweight sports cars
 Caterham Barracks, a former military installation in Caterham, Surrey
 , a World War I Royal Navy minesweeper
 Caterham Common, a former cricket ground
 Caterham Cricket Club, a cricket club in Caterham, Surrey
 Caterham F1, a Formula One team based in the United Kingdom
 Caterham Racing (GP2 team), a motor racing team competing in the GP2 Series and GP2 Asia Series
 Caterham line, a railway commuter line running between Purley in South London and Caterham in Surrey
 Caterham High School, Clayhall, London
 Caterham School,  an independent co-educational day and boarding school in Caterham, Surrey
 Caterham railway station, serving Caterham, Surrey
 Ethel Caterham (born 1909), one of the oldest living people in the world
 Caterham, a character in H. G. Wells' novel The Food of the Gods and How It Came to Earth